Scott Cardle (born 28 September 1989) is a British former professional boxer who competed from 2012 to 2018. He held the British lightweight title from 2015 to 2016. As an amateur, he won a bronze medal in the welterweight division at the 2009 EU Championships. His elder brother, Joe, is a professional footballer.

Amateur career
Born in Blackpool, Lancashire, to Glasgow-born parents, Cardle had a successful amateur career fighting out of Kirkham ABC, As well as 7 national gold medals from the age of 14, Scott became an England and Team GB International, winning many international honours including gold medal in multi nation tournament in Dublin, Ireland in three consecutive years (2007, 2008 & 2009), Gold at 'Golden Gong Cup' tournament in Macedonia (2008), a bronze medal at a multi nation tournament in Germany (2008) beating Jeff Horn, a bronze medal at the 2009 European Union Amateur Boxing Championships at welterweight, he then dropped down a weight to light-welterweight for the AIBA World Boxing Championships in Milan in 2009  After beating Olympic Bronze Medalist, Frenchman, Alexis Vastine, he then lost to another Olympic Bronze Medallist, Cuban, Roniel Iglesias Sotolongo missing the chance to secure a world championship medal.

Professional boxing career 
Trained by Joe Gallagher in Bolton, Cardle made his professional debut in March 2012 with a points win over journeyman Sid Razak. He had seven more fights that year, winning them all. In April 2013, he beat Maxi Hughes unanimously to win the Central Area lightweight title. Wins over Gary Fox, Krzysztof Szot, and Paul Appleby preceded a challenge for the English title in September 2014 against defending champion Kirk Goodings, the fight also an eliminator for the British title. Cardle stopped Goodings in 35 seconds in the first round to take the title.

In May 2015 Cardle met Craig Evans at The O2 Arena for the vacant British title. The fight went the distance, with both fighters suffering cuts, Cardle took a unanimous decision to become British champion. He was due to make his first defence of the title in September 2015 against Gary Buckland but a quadriceps tear sustained in sparring ruled him out of the fight, and he went on to make his first defence in November at the Echo Arena, Liverpool, against Sean Dodd. Despite sustaining cuts above both eyes after a tough eleven rounds, Cardle stopped Dodd in the twelfth and final round to retain the title."Scott Cardle vows to improve" The stoppage was controversial, and Cardle agreed to a rematch with Dodd in 2016 which ended in a draw. Cardle then defended his Lonsdale belt in Glasgow against Mandatory challenger, Grimsbys Kevin Hooper. Cardle stopped Hooper in the 6th round to retain the belt and after defending the title three times, Cardle thought he had won the Lonsdale belt outright not knowing his draw against Dodd didn't count.

Scott Cardle then lost his British lightweight title to Yorkshireman Robbie Barrett on 15 April 2017. Barrett won by majority decision, the judges scorecards reading 114–114, 112–114 and 113–115. Not securing a rematch clause and with Barrett not interested in a rematch, Cardle eventually got another crack at the title, losing to Newcastles Lewis Ritson by stoppage in the third round.
in 2019, after losing to three time, three weight world champion, Ricky Burns in November 2018, Cardle decided to retire from the sport

Outside of boxing 
A fan of Celtic F.C., Cardle got to play for the club in September 2015 in a charity match in honour of Jock Stein against Dunfermline Athletic F.C.

Professional boxing record

References

External links

1989 births
Living people
People from Lytham St Annes
Sportspeople from Lancashire
English male boxers
Lightweight boxers